Phantom inventory is a common expression for goods that an inventory accounting system considers to be on-hand at a storage location but are not available. This could be due to the items being moved without recording the change in the inventory accounting system, breakage, theft, data entry errors or deliberate fraud. The resulting discrepancy between the online inventory balance and physical availability can delay automated reordering and lead to out-of-stock incidents. 

If not addressed, phantom inventory can result in:

 Lost sales
 Inaccurate assessment of store or product sales performance
 Reduced accuracy of demand forecasts and plans
 Broader accounting issues and restatements

A number of techniques have been used to correct phantom inventory problems, including physical cycle counts, RFID tagging of items and statistical modelling of phantom inventory conditions.

See also
 Inventory
 Inventory control system
 Inventory management software
 Operations management
 Supply chain management
 Warehouse management system

References

External links 
Consumer Goods Technology Systemically Reduce Out-of-Stocks through the Elimination of False Positives 
 The Wall Street Journal Guest Voices: Retail’s Phantom Inventory Menace, or the Ghosts of Holidays Present 
Alloy Phantom Inventory, and What Makes It So Scary [3]

Inventory